Shigeru Uchida (born 29 August 1937) is a Japanese professional golfer.

Uchida played on the Japan Golf Tour, winning five times. He also won many other tournaments in Japan and enjoyed a successful senior career, during which he won the Japan PGA Senior Championship on two occasions.

Professional wins

Japan Golf Tour wins (5)
1977 Sanpo Classic
1980 Japan PGA East vs West Match
1981 Chubu Open
1982 Toyama Open, Chubu Open

Asia Golf Circuit wins (1)
1973 Sobu International Open

Other wins (14)
1966 Chunichi Crowns
1968 Kansai Circuit Nagasaki Series
1969 Kansai Open, All Star Tournament
1970 Kansai Circuit Nagasaki Series
1971 Tokai Classic, Chubu Open, All Nippon Doubles Tournament (with Hiroshi Ishii), Asahi International
1974 Mizuno Open
1975 Mizuno Open, Sanpo Champions Tournament
1978 All Star Tournament
1982 KSB Kagawa Open

Senior wins (20)
1987 Kansai Professional Senior Championship, Dai-ichi Life Cup, Phoenix Cup
1988 Kansai Professional Senior Championship
1988 Hazama Classic
1989 Yanase Cup, Hazama Classic
1990 Yanase Cup, Hazama Classic, Imperial Wing Gold Cup
1991 Yanase Cup, Dai-ichi Life Cup
1992 Crane Cup Kansai Professional Senior Championship, Maruman Senior Tournament
1993 Japan PGA Senior Championship
1994 Japan PGA Senior Championship
1997 Japan PGA Grand Senior Championship
1998 Kansai Pro Grand Senior Championship
1999 Japan Grand Senior Golf Tournament
2007 Kansai Pro Golf Gold Senior Championship

Team appearances
World Cup (representing Japan): 1978

External links

Shigeru Uchida at the PGA of Japan official website

Japanese male golfers
Japan Golf Tour golfers
Sportspeople from Shizuoka Prefecture
1937 births
Living people